Hershel M. Jick (born December 1, 1931) is an American medical researcher and associate professor of medicine at Boston University School of Medicine, where he was formerly the director of the Boston Collaborative Drug Surveillance Program.

Education 
Jick graduated from Harvard Medical School in 1956 and completed an internal medicine residency and clinical pharmacology fellowship.

Career 
Jick is known for researching the negative and positive effects of pharmaceutical drugs. A 1977 study by him and his assistant Jane Porter reported that no more than one patient per 3,600 died because of incorrect drug prescriptions. The "Porter–Jick study" was mentioned in the Hulu miniseries Dopesick and Jick was portrayed by theatre actor Mark Jacoby. In 1980, Jick and Porter published the letter "Addiction Rare in Patients Treated with Narcotics", which has been cited to argue that opioids are rarely addictive. Jick has said that this study had multiple limitations, such as that it only pertained to patients in the hospital, and did not assess the risk of addiction when opioids were prescribed in outpatient settings.

Outside of medicine, Jick is the author of the book A Listener's Guide to Mozart's Music.

References

External links
Faculty profile

Boston University faculty
Physicians from Massachusetts
Living people
Harvard Medical School alumni
1931 births